Intervention is an American documentary series that premiered on March 6, 2005, on A&E. It follows one or two participants, who are dependent on or addicted to drugs and/or alcohol. They are documented in anticipation of an intervention meeting by family or friends. During the intervention meeting, loved ones give the addict an ultimatum: go to an inpatient drug rehabilitation program immediately, or else risk losing contact, income, or other privileges. The show follows up on the recovery progress for future episodes or for web shorts.

On May 24, 2013, A&E announced it had concluded the series, with remaining episodes to begin airing in June 2013. The final episode in the lineup aired on July 18, 2013, and concluded with reflections from past addicts and thanks from the producers to the interventionists, family members, treatment centers, and addicts. On August 5, 2014, however, LMN announced the revival of the series with a new season premiering in 2015.

A&E revealed the return of the show on January 13, 2015, and aired both a special behind-the-scenes episode showing the filming process and updates from former addicts. Season 24 premiered on June 13, 2022.

Overview
The show follows one or two participants who have either substance dependence or addiction. It is a documentary of their addiction, including graphic substance abuse and its effect upon their lives, until a surprise intervention event is conducted with a professional interventionist. It is intercut with interviews with relatives and friends. In the intervention, the addict is given an ultimatum: either undergo a 90-day, all-expenses-paid treatment plan at a rehabilitation facility or risk losing contact, income or privileges from their relatives and friends.

In situations where the individuals in the addict's close circle have become codependent or otherwise traumatized by the addict's behavior, the interventionist usually recommends that the entire family seek counseling to enable them to move on. Medical detoxification is available when drug withdrawal is dangerous.

Interventionists
The cast for each episode is primarily the addict and their family and friends. The only regular cast member in each episode is the interventionist. The series started with three regular specialists and gained many more.  Ken Seeley is a methamphetamine addict, Jeff VanVonderen is a former pastor and alcoholic, Candy Finnigan is an adoptee, mother, and alcoholic, and Jenn Berman, PsyD is a Beverly Hills-based psychotherapist who made a single appearance in Episode 22.

Celebrity subjects

Most episodes feature average people, with a few entertainment professionals. Vanessa Marquez, a supporting actress on the first three seasons of ER, appeared in episode 2 due to a compulsive shopping disorder. Travis Meeks, lead singer of the Alternative rock band Days of the New, appeared in episode 6, focusing on his methamphetamine addiction. Antwahn Nance, a 6'10" former NBA power forward for the Los Angeles Clippers, was featured in episode 4, as he ended up homeless due to his crack cocaine addiction. Chuckie Negron, the son of Three Dog Night vocalist Chuck Negron, was featured in episode 6, with heroin addiction. Tressa Thompson, a women's shot put champion, was featured in episode 7, as her Olympic dreams were ended by her methamphetamine drug abuse. Aaron Brink, a porn star and once moderately successful mixed martial arts (MMA) fighter, featured in episode 8, lost both careers due to his methamphetamine addiction. Rocky Lockridge, a two-time Super Featherweight boxing champion, was featured in episode 113, due to his homelessness and drug addiction. Linda Li, an actress who played a Taresian woman in the Star Trek: Voyager episode "Favorite Son" as well as appearing as an extra in TV shows and movies, was featured in episode 1, battles an addiction to Actiq, a transmucosal Fentanyl lozenge on a stick or "perc-a-pop". David Sax Jr., the son of former Major League Baseball player Dave Sax and nephew of former Major League Baseball player Steve Sax, was shown battling an addiction to methamphetamine and alcohol.

Episodes

Reception
The show received the 2009 Emmy award for Outstanding Reality Program.

Criticism
Matthew Gilbert of The Boston Globe, a critic of the show, argues that the program is exploitative and showcases individuals as they self-destruct. He also argues that the confrontation within the intervention is milked to show only the most dramatic moments and that the final results of the intervention and subsequent rehabilitation are glossed-over.

Melanie McFarland, another television critic, also laments that the show does little to educate on successful intervention and instead deceives the subjects of each episode in order to film them at their lowest point.

Legacy
During early 2011, A&E aired the series Relapse, which ran for five episodes. Each episode focuses on sober coaches' work with long-time addicts who have been unable to get clean after repeated attempts at treatment. Coach Seth Jaffe became an interventionist on the main series.

Several spin-off series were launched. On September 9, 2011, Intervention Canada debuted on Slice Network. On December 28, 2012, Teen Trouble debuted on Lifetime which is executive produced by Bryn Freedman, a former Intervention producer. On March 8, 2016, Intervention: Codependent premiered on LMN.

In popular culture
There are countless television references to Intervention, including parodies of being addicted to the show.

On April 16, 2010, the video "Best Cry Ever" was posted on YouTube, featuring a clip from Season 7 episode "Rocky". The clip centers around a dramatic scene in which former professional boxer Rocky Lockridge is crying in a distinctive way. It has become an Internet phenomenon. A Saturday Night Live sketch features an Intervention parody with guest host Jon Hamm crying in a similar fashion.

References

External links
 
 

2000s American reality television series
2010s American reality television series
2005 American television series debuts
A&E (TV network) original programming
Works about addiction
English-language television shows
Primetime Emmy Award for Outstanding Reality Program winners
American television series revived after cancellation
Television series by GRB Entertainment
2020s American reality television series